WLMI is a radio station licensed to Grand Ledge, Michigan, serving Lansing. Owned by Midwest Communications, it broadcasts a classic hits format branded as Cruisin 92.9.

History 

What is now WLMI began life as WCER-FM in Charlotte, Michigan, in 1963.  The station was co-owned with WCER (1390 AM, now Christian-formatted WLCM). On July 1, 1979, WCER-FM changed its calls to WMMQ, and on September 1 of that year, WMMQ separated programming from its AM sister and aired an adult contemporary/sports format as Q92.

By the mid-1980s, WMMQ was struggling in the ratings and losing to its Lansing-based A/C competitors, and the station's owners quietly prepared a format change. On April 15, 1985, WMMQ changed to a then brand-new format called Classic rock, making it one of the first FM stations in the United States with such a format. The station was consulted by Fred Jacobs, revered as the "father" of the Classic Rock format, and quickly became one of the most popular stations in mid-Michigan, and Jacobs' first Classic Rock success story.

After WMMQ moved to 94.9 FM on June 1, 1997, 92.7 became WVIC (94.9 was, for many years, WVIC-FM) and broadcast intermittently for the next several years. When it was on the air, WVIC aired fully automated classical music with no announcers and oddly placed legal station IDs, and with no commercials except for public-service announcements. Oddly, the station actually did show up in the Lansing Arbitron ratings during this time.

From 2001 to 2005, the station was WQTX, airing sports talk as "The Ticket."  Shows such as "The Sports Page" with Jack Ebling and Tom Crawford (now at crosstown WILS), "The Sports Inferno" with Mike Valenti (now at WXYT/Detroit), and "Mad Dog & Company" with David "The Mad Dog" DeMarco and longtime producer Brock Palmbos (now at crosstown WVFN) helped to push "The Ticket" ahead of crosstown rival, WVFN, in the ratings.

In October 2005, WQTX flipped to Smooth Jazz, adopting Jones Radio Networks' smooth jazz format, and changed call letters to WJZL; the Sports Talk format continued on former simulcast partner WTXQ. In April 2006, 92.1 FM abandoned the Sports Talk format for good as it flipped to Oldies, taking the WQTX calls formerly used on 92.7. WJZL eventually shifted its frequency to 92.9. Following the demise of Jones' Smooth Jazz network in September 2008, WJZL switched over to Broadcast Architecture's "Smooth Jazz Network" programming.

The station operated for many months on 92.9 at reduced power until November 16, 2007, when it was able to broadcast at 5,400 watts. Until the station went to full power, its weak signal was prone to severe fading and co-channel interference from WJZQ-FM in Cadillac, Michigan, even into Clinton County, which is located just north of Lansing. WJZL now has a much stronger signal in the immediate Lansing area and can be heard as far as Jackson in the south, Howell in the east, and Hastings in the west. The station, along with WJXQ, WVIC, and WQTX, was sold from Rubber City Radio to Midwest Communications in May 2010.

The station changed its call letters to WLMI in October 2010; after playing Christmas music for the holiday season, the station flipped to a locally-programmed classic hits format on December 27, picking up the format from WQTX's impending switch to country. On April 25, 2017, Midwest Communications announced that WLMI would switch to CHR the next day as i92.9.

On July 31, 2020, WLMI began running liners promoting that a "revolution" would begin at noon on that day. At that time, after playing "Bang!" by AJR, the station flipped to classic hits as "Cruisin' 92.9". The first song on Cruisin' was "Revolution" by The Beatles.

References

External links

LMI
Radio stations established in 1963
1963 establishments in Michigan
Midwest Communications radio stations
Classic hits radio stations in the United States